Back to God's Country is a 1953 American adventure western film directed by Joseph Pevney starring Rock Hudson, Marcia Henderson and Steve Cochran.

Plot
In the late 1800s in the remote western regions of North America, sinister businessman Paul Blake and his helper Frank Hudson kill an Eskimo, steal his map and viciously beat his sled dog.

Schooner captain Peter Keith and wife Dolores arrive with a cargo of furs. Blake and Hudson conspire to keep Keith's boat in dock until conditions are too icy to sail. Blake wants the captain's goods and his wife as well.

After persuading two of Keith's crew to abandon ship, Blake kills the boat's cook. He also attacks Dolores, which leads to a fight with Keith. Hudson is secretly plotting to forge a will that will result in his inheriting all of his partner's money, but nevertheless he comes to Blake's rescue in the fight, seriously injuring Keith.

Traveling by sled to a fort where he can receive desperately needed medical attention, Keith and his wife must overcome an attack by wolves, an avalanche and a guide who only pretends to be their friend. Blake finds the fake will and kills Hudson, then sets out after Keith, only to fatally encounter the Eskimo's loyal dog.

Cast
 Rock Hudson as Peter Keith
 Marcia Henderson as Dolores Keith
 Steve Cochran as Paul Blake
 Hugh O'Brian as Frank Hudson
 Chubby Johnson as Shorter
 Tudor Owen as Fitzsimmons
 Arthur Space as Carstairs
 Bill Radovich as Lagi
 John Cliff as Joe
 Pat Hogan as Uppy
 Ivan Triesault as Reinhardt
 Charles Horvath as Nelson

External links
 
 
 

1953 films
1950s adventure drama films
American adventure drama films
Northern (genre) films
1953 Western (genre) films
American Western (genre) films
1950s historical adventure films
American historical adventure films
Films directed by Joseph Pevney
Films set in the 19th century
Universal Pictures films
Films scored by Frank Skinner
American remakes of Canadian films
Sound film remakes of silent films
1953 drama films
Films based on works by James Oliver Curwood
Avalanches in film
1950s English-language films
1950s American films